Albert Russell (Born Albert E. Lerche; August 2, 1890 – March 4, 1929) was an American director, screenwriter and actor of the silent era. He directed 18 films between 1919 and 1923. He also wrote for five screenplays between 1916 and 1921.

He was born in New York, New York, and died from pneumonia in Los Angeles, California. His brother was actor William Russell, who died two weeks earlier from pneumonia.

Filmography

 Baseball Madness (1917)
 The Lion Man (1919) 
 The Moon Riders (1920 – story) 
 'In Wrong' Wright (1920) 
 Double Danger (1920) 
 Tipped Off (1920) 
 Fight It Out (1920) 
 The Trail of the Hound (1920) 
 The Driftin' Kid (1921)
 Kickaroo (1921) 
 No Monkey Business (1921) (as Al Russell) 
 The White Horseman (1921) 
 The Secret Four (1921) 
 The Room of Death (1921) (as Al Russell) 
 Matching Wits (1922)
 Trickery (1922) (as Al Russell) 
 The Call of Courage (1922) (as Al Russell) 
 A Treacherous Rival (1922) (as Al Russell) 
 The Verdict (1922) (as Al Russell) 
 Lone Fighter (1923)

References

External links

1890 births
1929 deaths
American film directors
American male screenwriters
American male film actors
American male silent film actors
Deaths from pneumonia in California
Western (genre) film directors
20th-century American male actors
Male actors from New York City
Screenwriters from New York (state)
20th-century American male writers
20th-century American screenwriters